U.S. Route 15 (US 15) is a north–south U.S. Highway running from Walterboro, South Carolina to Painted Post, New York.

Route description

From the South Carolina state line, US 15 is in concurrency with US 401 to Laurinburg. After Laurinburg it goes north to Aberdeen, linking briefly with US 1 before continuing to Pinehurst. In Pinehurst, 15-501 goes through a rare roundabout, then continues north, through Carthage, back to US 1. After another brief concurrency with US 1 through Sanford, it exits off the freeway and goes due north to Pittsboro. After Pittsboro, 15-501 becomes an expressway, connecting the cities of Chapel Hill and Durham; this section of the route is famous because of the two universities it connects: University of North Carolina at Chapel Hill and Duke University. Though the road is a symbol of the separation of the Carolina-Duke rivalry, NCDOT has been trying to remedy that by making the route a superstreet for better traffic flow. In Durham, 15-501 upgrades to an urban freeway, allowing for quick access from south Durham to north; the freeway ends merging into Interstate 85. At exit 176B (on I-85), US 501 splits off towards Roxboro, while US 15 continues with I-85 towards Oxford.

After Durham, US 15 continues to follow I-85 till exit 186A, where it goes first to Creedmoor, then on into Oxford.  After going through downtown Oxford, it continues north, near Mayo Lake, to Clarksville, Virginia.

History
Established in 1927, it was aligned along NC 75 from the South Carolina state line, through Rockingham, Pinehurst and Durham, to the Virginia state line.

Junction list

See also
 Special routes of U.S. Route 15

References

External links

 
 NCRoads.com: U.S. 15

15-501
 North Carolina
North Carolina
Transportation in Durham, North Carolina
Transportation in Scotland County, North Carolina
Transportation in Hoke County, North Carolina
Transportation in Moore County, North Carolina
Transportation in Lee County, North Carolina
Transportation in Chatham County, North Carolina
Transportation in Orange County, North Carolina
Transportation in Durham County, North Carolina
Transportation in Granville County, North Carolina